Quietrevolution (often stylized with lower-case "q": quietrevolution) is a brand of vertical-axis wind turbines owned since 2014 by VWT Power in the United Kingdom.

Quietrevolution's helical designs are related to the Gorlov turbine, which evolved from the Darrieus wind turbine. Quietrevolution's qr5 model won several awards, including Building magazine's 2006 Sustainable Innovation Award. However, the qr5 did not perform well enough to ensure the original company's success, and it went into administration in 2014. The company and its intellectual property were taken over later in 2014 by VWT Power Limited, which now offers an improved qr6 model.

Both models consist of three vertical airfoil blades, each having a helical twist of 120 degrees. This feature spreads the torque evenly over the entire revolution, thus preventing the destructive pulsations of the straight-bladed giromill (Darrieus turbine). The wind pushes each blade around on both the windward and leeward sides of the turbine.

Seven qr5 turbines were erected in 2012 at the Olympic Park in London in a failed attempt to generate on site 20% of the park's post-games energy requirements. The turbines' usefulness was questioned: they were possibly net consumers of energy. 

A public relations setback for the qr5 and original company was the poor performance of the turbine installed at Welsh government offices in Aberystwyth. The company blamed poor siting for the £48,000 turbine's generation of a monthly average of £5.28 worth of electricity (33 kWh) in 2012.

See also

List of wind turbine manufacturers
Distributed generation
Net metering
Betz's law

References

External links 

 Quietrevolution

Wind turbines
Companies based in Cambridgeshire
British brands